Zuckmayer is a German surname. Notable people with the surname include:

 Carl Zuckmayer (1896–1977), German writer and playwright
 Eduard Zuckmayer (1890–1972), German pedagogue, composer, conductor, and pianist

German-language surnames